The women's 3000 metres steeplechase at the 2022 World Athletics Championships was held at the Hayward Field in Eugene on 16 and 20 July 2022.

Summary

With 3 of the last four World Championships (and the last 15 Men's) were born in Kenya. Kenyan dominance in the steeplechase is expected, particularly in Kenya.  Returning champion, world record holder Beatrice Chepkoech didn't return due to injury, two of their representatives did not make it out of the heats, leaving only #6 of all time Celliphine Chespol to wear their uniform. However two additional Kenyan born runners were representing other countries; #4 of all time Winfred Yavi  representing Bahrain and #3 of all time Norah Jeruto recently becoming eligible to run for Kazakhstan. The poaching of international free agent athletes has been quite an issue World Athletics has been trying to deal with. World Athletics blocked eligibility transfers in an attempt to revise the rules.

In the first heat, Jeruto ran an impressive, but unnecessary 9:01.54, the #26 time in history simply to be the leading qualifier.  Ten seconds behind her Marwa Bouzayani, wearing a hijab uniform was an automatic qualifier.

In the final, Jeruto went to the front off the line, tracked immediately by Yavi. The pack strung out to single file, with 2017 champion, returning silver medalist Emma Coburn, Olympic gold medalist Peruth Chemutai, Mekides Abebe and Werkuha Getachew latching onto the front of that train.  By three laps, that group had separated from the rest of the pack, the approximate 1K mark reached in 2:57.  On the next lap, Yavi moved to the front, still pushing the pace. Only Jeruto and Getachew could hold on, the second kilometer covered in 3:01.  Abebe was still hanging on 6 metres behind the leading three, trying to bridge back to the front.  Over the penultimate lap, Abebe managed to get back to the group just before the bell.  At the sound of the bell, Yavi edged back in front of Jeruto, but Jeruto would have none of that, reclaiming the lead halfway into the turn. With Yavi on the outside, Getachew took the inside track to come closer to Jeruto down the backstretch.  Coming into the water jump, Yavi made another run at the lead, with Jeruto looking at her. Jeruto took the water jump cleanly, leaping to a 2 metre lead, Yavi took it awkwardly, stopping before taking the final step out of the water, with both Ethiopians passing her in the process. From there Jeruto expanded her lead, with Getachew then Abebe following her home. Yavi took the final barrier poorly and the fight for a medal was over.

Jeruto's 8:53.02 was the Championship record and the #3 time ever run, still less than a second faster than she had run a year earlier on this same track at the Prefontaine Classic.  Getachew's 8:54.61 moved her to the #4 position in history, with Abebe's 8:56.08 putting her in #5.

Records
Before the competition records were as follows:

Qualification standard
The standard to qualify automatically for entry was 9:30.00.

Schedule
The event schedule, in local time (UTC−7), was as follows:

Results

Heats 

The first 3 athletes in each heat (Q) and the next 6 fastest (q) qualified to the final.

Final 
The final was started on 20 July at 19:45.

References

Steeplechase
Steeplechase at the World Athletics Championships